National Democratic Training Committee (NDTC) is a 527 political action committee formed in 2016 to train American Democratic party candidates at all levels of government to run for public office.

History 
NDTC was founded in 2016 by Democratic operative Kelly Dietrich.

In 2018, the group launched online training for NGP VAN's "VoteBuilder", the voter database used by the Democratic Party.

In 2019, NDTC launched their Staff Academy program to provide training for Democratic campaign staff. NDTC trained a group of 60 new Democratic campaign staff through an eight-week training, which featured both in-person and online components. NDTC partnered with state and national party committees to recruit trainees for the program, which saw more than 600 applicants. The program was developed to provide Democratic campaigns with "high-quality, diverse, and trained staff members" for the 2020 election cycle.

According to its FEC report, NDTC raised $7.35 million during the 2018 election cycle.

Format 
The training has taken the form of on-site as well as online classes with students ranging from activists, campaign volunteers and staff, and candidates. The group partners with state Democratic parties, as well as similar groups like Run for Something and EMILY's List. NDTC trainings cover topics like communications, campaign finance, and canvassing.

Reception 
The group claims its trainings helped elect more than 170 Democrats in the 2018 United States elections, including three Congressional candidates.

The group has been generally welcomed by state Democratic parties, with former head of the North Dakota Democratic Party Kylie Oversen stating the group has helped state parties encourage potential candidates to run for office.

The Washington Post said that some Democrats have called the group's primary fundraising consultant, Mothership Strategies, "unethical," because of its "aggressive and sometimes misleading tactics," such as claiming that President Trump was preparing to fire the special counsel. Mothership charges some clients a commission of 15 percent, higher than the industry standard of 7 to 10 percent. Their fundraising tactics are effective, in raising large amounts of money, but the Democratic critics of Mothership Strategies worry that the company’s profits are built on exaggerating fears, and could erode trust among small donors needed in the future.

References 

United States political action committees
2016 establishments in the United States
Democratic Party (United States)